Maprotiline, sold under the brand name Ludiomil among others, is a tetracyclic antidepressant (TeCA) that is used in the treatment of depression. It may alternatively be classified as a tricyclic antidepressant (TCA), specifically a secondary amine. In terms of its chemistry and pharmacology, maprotiline is closely related to other secondary amine TCAs like nortriptyline and protriptyline, and has similar effects to them.

Medical uses
Maprotiline is used in the treatment of depression, such as depression associated with agitation or anxiety and has similar efficacy to the antidepressant drug moclobemide.
 Treatment of depression of all forms and severities (endogenous, psychotic, involutional, and neurotic) especially for depression associated with agitation or anxiety
 Panic disorder
 Neuropathic pain
 Treatment of the depressive phase in bipolar depression
 For the symptomatic relief of anxiety, tension or insomnia

The use of maprotiline in the treatment of enuresis in pediatric patients has so far not been systematically explored and its use is not recommended. Safety and effectiveness in the pediatric population in general have not been established. Anyone considering the use of maprotiline in a child or adolescent must balance the potential risks with the clinical need. In general, lower dosages are recommended for patients over 60 years of age. Dosages of 50 mg to 75 mg daily are usually satisfactory as maintenance therapy for elderly patients who do not tolerate higher amounts.

Available forms
 Coated Tablets, 10 mg, 25 mg, 50 mg, and 75 mg
 Injectable concentrate, 25 mg

Contraindications
Maprotiline may worsen psychotic conditions like schizophrenia and should be given with caution. The antipsychotic treatment should be continued. Patients with bipolar affective disorder should not receive antidepressants whilst in a manic phase, as antidepressants can worsen mania.

Absolute
 Hypersensitivity to maprotiline or to other TCAs and TeCAs
 Hypertrophy of the prostate gland with urine hesitancy
 Closed angle glaucoma

Special caution needed
 Concomitant treatment with a MAO inhibitor
 Serious impairment of liver and kidney function
 Epilepsy and other conditions that lower the seizure threshold (active brain tumors, alcohol withdrawal, other medications)
 Serious cardiovascular conditions (arrhythmias, heart insufficience, state after myocardial infarction etc.)
 Treatment of patients under age 18

Suicidal patients
Same as other antidepressants, maprotiline increased the risk compared to placebo of suicidal thinking and behavior (suicidality) in children, adolescents and young adults in short-term studies of major depressive disorder (MDD) and other psychiatric disorders. Anyone considering the use of maprotiline or any other antidepressant in a child, adolescent, or young adult must balance this risk with the clinical need. Short-term studies did not show an increase in the risk of suicidality with antidepressants compared to placebo in adults beyond age 24; there was a reduction in risk with antidepressants compared to placebo in adults aged 65 and older. Depression and certain other psychiatric disorders are themselves associated with increases in the risk of suicide. Patients of all ages who are started on antidepressant therapy should be monitored appropriately and observed closely for clinical worsening, suicidality, or unusual changes in behavior. Families and caregivers should be advised of the need for close observation and communication with the prescriber. Maprotiline is not approved for use in pediatric patients.

Pregnancy and lactation
Reproduction studies have been performed in female laboratory rabbits, mice, and rats at doses up to 1.3, 7, and 9 times the maximum daily human dose respectively and have revealed no evidence of impaired fertility or harm to the fetus due to maprotiline. There are, however, no adequate and well controlled studies in pregnant women. Because animal reproduction studies are not always predictive of human response, this drug should be used during pregnancy only if clearly needed.

Maprotiline is excreted in breast milk. At steady-state, the concentrations in milk correspond closely to the concentrations in whole blood. Caution should be exercised when maprotiline hydrochloride is administered to a nursing woman.

Side effects
The side-effect profile is comparable to other TCAs and TeCAS and many of the following are due to anticholinergic (which are less prominent than those of most TCAs) and antihistamine effects. Most often seen are:
 Dizziness
 Drowsiness
 Somnolence
 Fatigue
 Dry mouth (and complications of long-term uncontrolled dry mouth such as dental caries) 
 Constipation
 Vertigo
 Nausea (rare, incidence of ~2%) and vomiting
 Increased appetite and weight gain
 Orthostatic hypotension, hypertension, sinus tachycardia, heart-block, arrhythmias and other cardiac effects
 Sexual dysfunction in men: impotence, priapism, delayed ejaculation, anejaculation, decreased libido
 Sexual dysfunction in women: decreased libido, vaginal dryness, painful sexual intercourse, anorgasmia
 Allergic skin reactions such as rash or urticaria (more often than with other antidepressants). Rarely, severe skin reactions such as erythema multiforme can occur.
 Photosensitivity
 Agitation, confusion
 Induction of hypomania or mania in patients with underlying bipolar affective disorder
 Psychotic symptoms
 Tremor
 Extrapyramidal symptoms
 Headache
 Seizures (at high doses)
 Rare haematological complications: leukopenia and agranulocytosis (dangerous fall in white blood cells)
 Fever
 Urinary retention

Maprotiline causes a strong initial sedation (first 2 to 3 weeks of therapy) and is therefore indicated to treat agitated patients or those with suicidal risks. It causes anticholinergic side effects (dry mouth, constipation, confusion, tachycardia) with a lower incidence than amitriptyline. Originally, the manufacturer claimed that maprotiline is better tolerated than other TCAs and TeCAs. However, seizures, leukopenia and skin reactions occur more often with maprotiline than with comparable drugs like amitriptyline.

Maprotiline has no known potential for abuse and psychological dependence.

Withdrawal
Withdrawal symptoms frequently seen when treatment with maprotiline is stopped abruptly (agitation, anxiety, insomnia, sometimes activation of mania or rebound depression) are not indicative of addiction and can be avoided by reducing the daily dose of maprotiline gradually by approximately 25% each week. If treatment has to be stopped at once due to medical reasons, the use of a benzodiazepine (e.g. lorazepam, clonazepam, or alprazolam) for a maximum of 4 weeks as needed will usually suppress withdrawal symptoms.

Interactions
Maprotiline has a wide range of possible interactions. Some are typical for TCAs and TeCAs, others are caused by specific metabolic effects (e.g. high plasma-protein-binding) of maprotiline:
 Irreversible MAO-inhibitors: agitation, delirium, coma, hyperpyrexia (high fever), seizures and severe changes in blood pressure. Treatment-resistant and hospitalized patients may be treated concomitantly with an MAO-inhibitor, if they are closely monitored and if the initial dose of the MAO-Inhibitor is low.

Increased drug actions:
 Other antidepressants, barbiturates, narcotics, sedating antihistamines, anticonvulsive drugs, alcohol - resulting in increased central depression
 Anticholinergics (antiparkinsonian agents, TCAs and TeCAs) - resulting in increased anticholinergic action (dry mouth, constipation etc.)
 Sympathomimetics (also those used in local anesthetics like noradrenaline) : sympathomimetic effects increased (increased blood pressure, pulse rate, paleness of skin etc.)
 Nitrates and antihypertensives (e.g. beta-blockers) - increased antihypertensive action with pronounced fall in blood pressure

Decreased drug actions:
 Guanethidine, Reserpine, Guanfacine : antihypertensive effects decreased
 Clonidine : antihypertensive effects decreased and risk of (massive) rebound hypertension.

Other types of interaction:
 Drugs, which induce certain enzymes in the liver, e.g. barbiturates, phenytoin, carbamazepine and oral anticonceptive drugs, enhance the elimination of maprotiline and decrease its antidepressant effects. Additionally the blood-concentrations of phenytoin or carbamazepine may be increased, leading to a higher incidents of side effects.
 The concomitant use of maprotiline and neuroleptics can lead to increased maprotiline blood-levels and to seizures. Combining maprotiline and thioridazine could induce severe arrhythmias.
 Additionally, increased blood-levels of Maprotiline are possible, if certain beta-blocking agents (e.g. Propranolol) are given concomitantly.
 Maprotiline may amplify the actions of coumarin-type anticoagulants (e.g. warfarin, phenprocoumon). The plasma-prothrombin-activity must be assessed closely in order to avoid overt bleedings.
 Maprotiline can increase the actions of oral antidiabetic drugs (sulfonylureas) and Insulin. Diabetic patients should have regular assessments of their blood-glucose-levels.
 The concomitant application with fluoxetine or fluvoxamine may lead to significantly increased plasma-levels of maprotiline with a high incidence of maprotiline side effects. Due to the long half-lives of fluoxetine and fluvoxamine this effect may persist.

Pharmacology

Pharmacodynamics

Maprotiline exhibits strong effects as a norepinephrine reuptake inhibitor with only weak actions the reuptake of serotonin and dopamine. It is also a strong antagonist of the H1 receptor, a moderate antagonist of the 5-HT2 and α1-adrenergic receptors, and a weak antagonist of the D2 and muscarinic acetylcholine receptors. Maprotiline has also more recently been identified as a potent antagonist of the 5-HT7 receptor, with this action potentially playing an important role in its antidepressant effectiveness. The drug is a strong antihistamine, but unlike most TCAs, has minimal anticholinergic effects.

The pharmacological profile of maprotiline explains its antidepressant, sedative, anxiolytic, and sympathomimetic activities. In accordance to the pharmacological characteristics it is used in the treatment of depression, such as depression associated with agitation or anxiety. Additionally, it shows strong antagonism against reserpine-induced effects in animal studies, as do the other 'classical' antidepressants. Although maprotiline behaves in most regards as a 'first-generation antidepressant' it is commonly referred to as 'second-generation antidepressant'.

The postulated mechanism of maprotiline is that it acts primarily by potentiation of central adrenergic synapses by blocking reuptake of norepinephrine at nerve endings. This pharmacological action is thought to be primarily responsible for the drug's antidepressant and anxiolytic effects. It is a strong norepinephrine reuptake inhibitor with only weak effects on serotonin and dopamine reuptake. At higher doses however, maprotiline increases serotonergic transmission and increases the level of serotonin available.

Pharmacokinetics
After oral use absorption is good. It binds to plasma proteins 80–90%. Maximal plasma concentration is reached 6 hours after use. The mean time to peak is 12 hours. The terminal half-life of averages 51 hours.

Chemistry

Maprotiline is a tetracyclic compound and is grouped with the TeCAs. Its chemical name is N-methyl-9,10-ethanoanthracen-9(10H)-propylamine. The drug has a dibenzobicyclo[2.2.2]octadiene (9,10-dihydro-9,10-ethanoanthracene) ring system; that is, a tricyclic anthracene ring system with an ethylene bridge across the central ring. This results in it having a unique three-dimensional central ring (a bicyclo[2.2.2]octane or 1,4-endoethylenecyclohexane ring) and being a tetracyclic rather than a tricyclic compound. However, it could also or alternatively be considered to be a tricyclic and hence a TCA. In addition to its heterocyclic ring system, maprotiline has an alkylamine side chain attached similarly to other TCAs (but notably unlike other TeCAs). In terms of the side chain, it is a secondary amine, and its chemical structure, aside from the ethylene link in the central ring, is similar to that of secondary amine TCAs like nortriptyline and protriptyline. In accordance, the pharmacology of maprotiline is very similar to that of secondary amine TCAs.

Maprotiline is very similar in structure to the anxiolytic, sedative, and muscle relaxant drug benzoctamine (Tacitin). The only structural difference between the two compounds is in the length of their side chain. However, this modification results in considerable differences in their pharmacological and therapeutic effects.

History
Maprotiline was developed by Ciba (now operated by Novartis). It was patented in 1966 and was first described in the literature in 1969. The drug was introduced for medical use in 1974. Generics are now widely available. It was introduced after most of the other TCAs but was the first TeCA to be developed and marketed, with the TeCAs mianserin and amoxapine following shortly thereafter and mirtazapine being introduced later on.

Society and culture

Generic names
Its generic name in Spanish and Italian and its  are maprotilina, in German is maprotilin, and in Latin is maprotilinum. The methanesulfonate (mesylate) salt is known unofficially as maprotiline methanesulfonate.

Brand names
Maprotiline is marketed throughout the world mainly under the brand name Ludiomil. It is also available under a variety of other brand names including Deprilept, Maprolu, and Psymion among others.

References

Alpha-1 blockers
Anthracenes
Novartis brands
Antihistamines
H1 receptor antagonists
Muscarinic antagonists
Norepinephrine reuptake inhibitors
Secondary amines
Serotonin receptor antagonists
Tetracyclic antidepressants
Tricyclic antidepressants